Tore Klas Agne Simonsson (19 October 1935 – 22 September 2020) was a Swedish footballer who played as a striker. Beginning his career with Örgryte IS in 1953, he went on to represent Real Madrid and Real Sociedad in La Liga in the early 1960s before returning to Örgryte in 1963. Simonsson won 51 caps for the Sweden national team, and was a part of the Sweden team that finished second at the 1958 FIFA World Cup. He was also the recipient of the 1959 Svenska Dagbladet Gold Medal after a spectacular performance for Sweden in an international game against England at Wembley Stadium.

Club career

Örgryte IS 
Simonsson played youth football for BK René before signing for Örgryte IS in 1949. He made his senior debut for Örgryte in 1953, when the team played in Division 3. He helped the team win promotion to Division 2 in 1955, and later won promotion to Allsvenskan in 1958 with Gunnar Gren as a player-coach. While at Örgryte IS, he finished fifth in votes for the 1959 Ballon d'Or and was awarded the 1959 Guldbollen.

Real Madrid 
Widely regarded as the best center forward in the world after a string of impressive performances for the Sweden national team, Simonsson was signed by the La Liga team Real Madrid in 1960. However, fierce competition from especially Alfredo Di Stéfano limited Simonsson's playing chances at the club and he ended up playing in only 3 league games during the 1960–61 La Liga season, scoring one goal as Real Madrid was crowned champions. He scored the third goal against Real Zaragoza in a 5–1 home win in 9th round. He was also a part of the Real Madrid teams that won the 1960 Intercontinental Cup and the 1962–63 La Liga, but did receive any playing time. As of 2022, Simonsson is still the only Swede ever to have represented Real Madrid.

Loan to Real Sociedad 
For the 1961–62 La Liga season, Simonsson was loaned out to Real Sociedad for which he scored 8 goals in 22 league games. However, at the end of the season Simonsson was forced to see his team be relegated, as the team finished 15th out of 16 teams in the table.

Return to Örgryte IS 
In 1963, Simonsson returned to Sweden and Örgryte IS to form a feared striker partnership together with Rune Börjesson. Simonsson is Örgryte IS' best ever goal scorer in league play with a total of 206 goals.

International career

Early career 
Simonsson made his only appearance for the Sweden U21 team on 22 September 1957 in a friendly game against Finland, scoring a hat-trick in a 7–0 win. He made his full international debut for Sweden a month later on 13 October 1957 in a 1956–59 Nordic Football Championship game against Norway, scoring two goals as Sweden won 5–2.

1958 FIFA World Cup 
Simonsson scored four goals as Sweden reached the final of the 1958 FIFA World Cup on home soil, including a goal in the final as Sweden lost 2–5 to Brazil.

Later career 
He was awarded the 1959 Svenska Dagbladet Gold Medal as well as the 1959 Guldbollen after his performance against England on 28 October 1959 when Sweden beat the English 3–2 at Wembley Stadium and Simonsson scored two goals and made one assist. This was only the second time in history that a team beat England at Wembley.

He won his 51st and final cap in a 2–0 win against Finland on 10 August 1967 in the 1964–67 Nordic Football Championship. He scored a total of 27 international goals.

Managerial career 
In 1982, he managed BK Häcken to win promotion to their first ever season in Allsvenskan. As a manager for Örgryte IS, Simonsson led the team to the 1985 Swedish Championship title, winning them their first league title since 1913.

Career statistics

International 

Scores and results list Sweden's goal tally first, score column indicates score after each Simonsson goal.

Honours

Player 
Örgryte IS
 Division 2 Västra Götaland: 1957–58

Real Madrid 

 La Liga: 1960–61, 1962–63
Intercontinental Cup: 1960

Sweden 

 FIFA World Cup runner-up: 1958
 Nordic Football Championship: 1956–1959
Individual
 Svenska Dagbladet Gold Medal: 1959
 Guldbollen: 1959
 Kristallkulan: 1959
 Nordic Football Championship top scorer: 1956–1959
Records
 Most league goals for Örgryte IS: 206 goals

Manager 
BK Häcken
 Division 3 Nordvästra Götaland: 1977
Örgryte IS
 Swedish Champion: 1985

References

External links
SvFF Hall of Fame profile 
Fotbollsweden.se statistic

1935 births
2020 deaths
Swedish footballers
Swedish expatriate footballers
Expatriate footballers in Spain
Swedish expatriate sportspeople in Spain
Örgryte IS players
La Liga players
Real Madrid CF players
Real Sociedad footballers
Sweden international footballers
1958 FIFA World Cup players
Association football forwards
Swedish football managers
Örgryte IS managers
BK Häcken managers
Iraklis Thessaloniki F.C. managers
Swedish expatriate football managers
Swedish expatriate sportspeople in Greece
Expatriate football managers in Greece
Footballers from Gothenburg